Kerteminde Fjord is a fjord of northeastern Funen, Denmark, south of the Odense Fjord. It stretches inland from the town of Kerteminde. The villages of Kertinge and Kolstrup are on the southeastern shore and Munkebo is to the north.

References

Fjords of Denmark
Geography of Funen
Geography of Kerteminde Municipality
Kerteminde Municipality